The 2019–20 NBL season was the 37th season for Melbourne United in the NBL, and the 6th under the banner of Melbourne United.

Roster

Depth chart

Preseason

Ladder

Game log 

|- style="background-color:#ffcccc;"
| 1
| 6 August
| California Baptist Lancers
| L 78-79
| David Barlow (30)
| Short, Lual-Acuil & Diing (6)
| Sam Short (5)
| Melbourne Sports and Aquatic Centre
| 0-1
|- style="background-color:#ccffcc;"
| 2
| 18 August
| Zhejiang Lions
| W 97-77
| Jo Lual-Acuil (20)
| Jack Purchase (11)
| Mitch McCarron (6)
| Melbourne Sports and Aquatic Centre
| 1-1
|- style="background-color:#ccffcc;"
| 3
| 3 September
| Shanxi Loongs
| W 111-66
| Shawn Long (22)
| Mitch McCarron (10)
| Casey Prather (6)
| State Basketball Centre
| 2-1
|- style="background-color:#ccffcc;"
| 4
| 6 September
| Cairns Taipans
| W 104-88
| Jo Lual-Acuil (25)
| Jo Lual-Acuil (9)
| Mitch McCarron (6)
| Casey Stadium
| 3-1
|- style="background-color:#ffcccc;"
| 5
| 8 September
| Brisbane Bullets
| L 80-102
| Shawn Long (22)
| Shawn Long, Jo Lual-Acuil (10)
| Melo Trimble (4)
| Melbourne Sports and Aquatic Centre
| 3-2
|- style="background-color:#ccffcc;"
| 6
| 13 September
| Illawarra Hawks
| W 111-70
| Casey Prather (31)
| Shawn Long (11)
| Mitch McCarron (6)
| Ballarat Sports Events Centre
| 4-2

|- style="background-color:#ffcccc;"
| 1
| 20 September
| New Zealand Breakers
| L 76-97
| Shawn Long (24)
| Shawn Long (8)
| Melo Trimble (3)
| Kingborough Sports Centre
| 0-1
|- style="background-color:#ccffcc;"
| 2
| 22 September
| Illawarra Hawks
| W 110-91
| Casey Prather (23)
| Shawn Long (11)
| Shea Ili (5)
| Derwent Entertainment Centre
| 1-1

|- style="background-color:#ffcccc;"
| 7
| 25 September
| Perth Wildcats
| L 90-92
| Melo Trimble (17)
| Long, Pledger, Trimble (5)
| Melo Trimble (7)
| Geelong Arena
| 4-3
|- style="background-color:#ccffcc;"
| 8
| 27 September
| @ Adelaide 36ers
| W 91-100
| Melo Trimble (19)
| Jo Lual-Acuil, Mitch McCarron (8)
| Mitch McCarron (8)
| Adelaide Entertainment Centre
| 5-3

|- style="background-color:#ffcccc;"
| 1
| 13 October
| @ Los Angeles Clippers
| L 110-118
| Melo Trimble (22)
| Shawn Long (9)
| Melo Trimble (6)
| STAPLES Center 
| 5-4
|- style="background-color:#ffcccc;"
| 2
| 16 October
| @ Sacramento Kings
| L 110-124
| Chris Goulding (25)
| Shawn Long (15)
| Melo Trimble (6)
| Golden 1 Center 
| 5-5

Regular season

Ladder

Game log 

|- style="background-color:#ffcccc;"
| 1
| 3 October
| South East Melbourne Phoenix
| L 88-91
| Chris Goulding (27)
| Shawn Long (13)
| Melo Trimble (6)
| Melbourne Arena 
| 0-1
|- style="background-color:#ffcccc;"
| 2
| 5 October
| @ Perth Wildcats
| L 94-93
| Melo Trimble (25)
| Melo Trimble (8)
| Melo Trimble (5)
| RAC Arena
| 0-2
|- style="background-color:#ffcccc;"
| 3
| 20 October
| Perth Wildcats
| L 93-95
| Melo Trimble (21)
| Shawn Long 12
| Melo Trimble 5
| Melbourne Arena
| 0-3
|- style="background-color:#ccffcc;"
| 4
| 26 October
| New Zealand Breakers
| W 104-98
| Shawn Long (27)
| Shawn Long (11)
| Mitch McCarron (7)
| Melbourne Arena
| 1-3
|- style="background-color:#ffcccc;"
| 5
| 28 October
| @ Cairns Taipans
| L 90-85
| Shawn Long, Melo Trimble (21)
| Shawn Long (17)
| Chris Goulding (5)
| Cairns Convention Centre
| 1-4

|- style="background-color:#ccffcc;"
| 6
| 2 November
| @ South East Melbourne Phoenix
| W 98-110
| Shawn Long (31)
| Shawn Long (11)
| Mitch McCarron (4)
| Melbourne Arena
| 2-4
|- style="background-color:#ccffcc;"
| 7
| 4 November
| Sydney Kings
| W 107-104
| Melo Trimble (27)
| Shawn Long (14)
| Melo Trimble (5)
| Melbourne Arena
| 3-4
|- style="background-color:#ccffcc;"
| 8
| 7 November
| @ New Zealand Breakers
| W 101-104
| Chris Goulding (24)
| Shawn Long (8)
| Melo Trimble (5)
| Spark Arena
| 4-4
|- style="background-color:#ccffcc;"
| 9
| 10 November
| Adelaide 36ers
| W 109-90
| Melo Trimble (32)
| David Barlow (7)
| Mitch McCarron (5)
| Melbourne Arena
| 5-4
|- style="background-color:#ccffcc;"
| 10
| 16 November
| South East Melbourne Phoenix
| W 96-95
| Melo Trimble (22)
| Shawn Long, Mitch McCarron (8)
| Shea Ili (4)
| Melbourne Arena
| 6-4
|- style="background-color:#ccffcc;"
| 11
| 24 November
| Brisbane Bullets
| W 108-94
| Melo Trimble (25)
| Jo Lual-Acuil (13)
| Mitch McCarron (7)
| Melbourne Arena
| 7-4
|- style="background-color:#ffcccc;"
| 12
| 29 November
| @ Cairns Taipans
| L 93-86
| Chris Goulding (19)
| Shawn Long (14)
| Chris Goulding, Melo Trimble (4)
| Cairns Convention Centre
| 7-5

|- style="background-color:#ffcccc;"
| 13
| 1 December
| @ Sydney Kings
| L 111-101
| Melo Trimble (32)
| Mitch McCarron (6)
| Melo Trimble (4)
| Qudos Bank Arena
| 7-6
|- style="background-color:#ccffcc;"
| 14
| 7 December
| Adelaide 36ers
| W 112-90
| Shawn Long (34)
| Shawn Long (15)
| Chris Goulding, Mitch McCarron (4)
| Melbourne Arena
| 8-6
|- style="background-color:#ffcccc;"
| 15
| 14 December
| Sydney Kings
| L 81-104
| Melo Trimble (19)
| Jo Lual-Acuil (6)
| Melo Trimble (5)
| Melbourne Arena
| 8-7
|- style="background-color:#ccffcc;"
| 16
| 16 December
| @ Illawarra Hawks
| W 73-94
| Melo Trimble (22)
| Shawn Long (14)
| Melo Trimble (6)
| WIN Entertainment Centre
| 9-7
|- style="background-color:#ccffcc;"
| 17
| 21 December
| @ Perth Wildcats
| W 74-87
| Shawn Long, Melo Trimble (23)
| Shawn Long (13)
| Melo Trimble (6)
| RAC Arena
| 10-7
|- style="background-color:#ffcccc;"
| 18
| 26 December
| Cairns Taipans
| L 75-77
| Melo Trimble (16)
| Shawn Long (12)
| Goulding, Ili, McCarron (2)
| Melbourne Arena
| 10-8
|- style="background-color:#ffcccc;"
| 19
| 29 December
| Brisbane Bullets
| L 96-102
| Shawn Long (25)
| Stanton Kidd, Shawn Long (8)
| Melo Trimble (7)
| Melbourne Arena
| 10-9

|- style="background-color:#ccffcc;"
| 20
| 4 January
| @ Illawarra Hawks
| W 91-104
| Chris Goulding, Stanton Kidd (21)
| Shawn Long (7)
| Melo Trimble (5)
| WIN Entertainment Centre
| 11-9
|- style="background-color:#ffcccc;"
| 21
| 11 January
| @ Adelaide 36ers
| L 100-86
| Chris Goulding (26)
| Shawn Long (15)
| Mitch McCarron, Melo Trimble (5)
| Adelaide Entertainment Centre
| 11-10
|- style="background-color:#ffcccc;"
| 22
| 19 January
| @ New Zealand Breakers
| L 90-68
| Shawn Long (18)
| Kidd, Long, Lual-Acuil, Trimble (4)
| Melo Trimble 5
| Spark Arena
| 11-11
|- style="background-color:#ffcccc;"
| 23
| 26 January
| @ Sydney Kings
| L 106-88
| Melo Trimble (26)
| Stanton Kidd (7)
| Melo Trimble (2)
| Qudos Bank Arena
| 11-12
|- style="background-color:#ccffcc;"
| 24
| 29 January
| Perth Wildcats
| W 77-67
| Chris Goulding (17)
| Jo Lual-Acuil (10)
| Ili, McCarron, Trimble (3)
| Melbourne Arena
| 12-12

|- style="background-color:#ffcccc;"
| 25
| 1 February
| @ Brisbane Bullets
| L 87-83
| Melo Trimble (36)
| Shawn Long (9)
| Melo Trimble (6)
| Nissan Arena
| 12-13
|- style="background-color:#ccffcc;"
| 26
| 8 February
| Illawarra Hawks
| W 95-72
| Chris Goulding (20)
| Stanton Kidd (10)
| Melo Trimble (9)
| Melbourne Arena
| 13-13
|- style="background-color:#ccffcc;"
| 27
| 13 February
| Cairns Taipans
| W 99-83
| Chris Goulding (23)
| Shawn Long (10)
| Mitch McCarron (8)
| Melbourne Arena 
| 14-13
|- style="background-color:#ccffcc;"
| 28
| 16 February
| @ South East Melbourne Phoenix
| W 90-109
| Chris Goulding (28)
| Shawn Long (11)
| Mitch McCarron (7)
| Melbourne Arena
| 15-13

Postseason

|- style="background-color:#ffcccc;"
| 1
| 29 February
| @ Sydney Kings
| L 86-80
| Melo Trimble (34)
| Shawn Long (11)
| Melo Trimble (5)
| Qudos Bank Arena
| 0-1
|- style="background-color:#ccffcc;"
| 2
| 2 March
| Sydney Kings
| W 125-80
| Shawn Long (26)
| Shawn Long (11)
| Mitch McCarron (5)
| Melbourne Arena
| 1-1
|- style="background-color:#ffcccc;"
| 3
| 5 March
| @ Sydney Kings
| L 89-87
| Chris Goulding (11)
| Shawn Long (9)
| Shea Ili (5)
| Qudos Bank Arena
| 1-2

Transactions

Re-signed

Additions

Subtractions

Awards

Player of the Week 
 Round 4, Shawn Long

 Round 20, Chris Goulding

Melbourne United Awards 
 Most Valuable Player: Shawn Long

 Best Defensive Player: Shea Ili

 Coaches Award: Shea Ili & Mitch McCarron

See also 

 2019–20 NBL season
 Melbourne United

References

External links 

 Official Website

Melbourne United
Melbourne United seasons
Melbourne United season